Strigoptera bimaculata is the type species in its genus of jewel beetles: in the tribe Polycestini.  Distribution records are from south-East Asia.

References

External links
 
 

Beetles of Asia
Beetles described in 1758